Clinical ethics support services initially developed in the United States of America, following court cases such as the Karen Ann Quinlan case, which stressed the need for mechanisms to resolve ethical disputes within health care. The Joint Commission on Accreditation of Healthcare Organizations requirement for hospitals, nursing homes, and home care agencies to have a standing mechanism to address ethical issues has also fostered this development (this requirement no longer appears in the Joint Commission regulations, however).

Despite initial doubts as the possibility of importing what was initially felt to be a specificity of the US system, ethics support services have developed in many other countries, including Canada but also various countries in Europe and Asia.

In order to share experience and resources among these clinical research ethics consultation and support services, networks and platforms have increasingly developed. This page is intended to summarise existing online resources aimed at assisting new and developing clinical ethics support services. Its goal is to make these resources more easily accessible. Listing in this page does not constitute endorsement of the various contents: users will still need to judge the value of these resources for themselves.

It is reasonable to suppose that these resources will increasingly be international. Because of the role of the English language in international communication, multi-lingual resources whose languages include English are given in their English title. Those not available in English are given in their original language.

Clinical ethics consultation networks

Listed by country

Canada
Provincial Health Ethics Network (Alberta)

United Kingdom
UK clinical ethics network

United States

Center for Practical Bioethics

Kansas Health Ethics Committee Network

Maryland Healthcare Ethics Committee Network

Midwest Ethics Committee Network

Johns Hopkins Research Ethics Consulting Service

National and international guidelines on clinical ethics

Listed by country

World Medical Association
International code of medical ethics

Australia
Australian Medical Association code of ethics

Canada
Canadian Medical Association code of ethics

India
Medical Council of India code of ethics

New Zealand
New Zealand Medical Association code of ethics

Switzerland
Medical ethics recommendations of the Swiss Academy of Medical Sciences

United Kingdom
British Medical Association's Medical Ethics portal

British General Medical Council’s Guidance on Good Medical Practice

United States

Center for Practical Bioethics

American Medical Association code of ethics

Clinical ethics committee guidelines

Many clinical ethics support services develop guidelines and advise policy within the health care setting. While the conclusions of consultations regarding individual patients are, of course, confidential, general ethical guidelines and policy advice regarding ethical difficulties which come up repeatedly in clinical care are not. Some ethics support services make these guidelines available online. Adding yours will make these resources more useful!

Listed by country

Switzerland
Recommandations du Conseil d'éthique clinique de Genève

United States
Center for Practical Bioethics

Methodological resources
Some networks and consultation services have developed tools and guidelines for the practice of clinical ethics consultation, and made them available online. The following sites provide tools, documents, and advice for new or developing clinical ethics support services:

Switzerland
Recommandations on "Ethics Support in medicine" from the Swiss Academy of Medical Sciences

United Kingdom
UK Clinical Ethics Network practical guide for clinical ethics support

United States
University of Washington guide on clinical ethics committees and consultation

Veterans' Administration (US) IntegratedEthics Tools and Materials

Online books
Principles of Biomedical Ethics (Tom L. Beauchamp, James F. Childress)

Ethics Consultation: from theory to practice (Mark P. Aulisio, Robert M. Arnold, Stuart J. Youngner)

Ethics Consultation (John La Puma, David L. Schiedermayer)

Cambridge textbook of bioethics (Peter A. Singer, Adrian M. Viens)

Selected articles
ASBH Task Force on Health Care Ethics Consultation: Nature, Goals, and Competencies

Clinical bioethics integration, sustainability, and accountability: the Hub and Spokes Strategy by the University of Toronto Joint Centre for Bioethics

Clinical ethics, information, and communication: review of 31 cases from a clinical ethics committee (Norway)

Moral Deliberation in the Netherlands

Clinical ethics consultation in Switzerland

Report on the conference “clinical ethics consultation: theories and methods—implementation—evaluation,” February 11–15, 2008, Bochum, Germany

Online tutorials

Listed by language

English

Skill Building in Ethics Case Consultation at the Neiswanger Institute

French

Études de cas du Conseil d'éthique clinique de Genève

International and national conferences

International Association of Bioethics

International Conference on Clinical Ethics and Consultation

Canada
Canadian Bioethics Society

Switzerland

Société Suisse d'Éthique Biomédicale / Schweizerische Gesellschaft für Biomedizinische Ethik

United States

American Society for Bioethics and the Humanities

See also

Bioethics
Medical Ethics
Nursing ethics
Autonomy
Principlism
Advance health care directive
Informed Consent
Evidence-based medical ethics
Do not resuscitate
Euthanasia

Assisted Suicide
Psychiatry#Ethics
Arthur Caplan
Ruth Faden
Ross Upshur
Joseph Fins
Edmund D. Pellegrino
Jonathan D. Moreno

References

Further reading
Stanford Encyclopedia of Philosophy:
 "Principle of Beneficence in Applied Ethics"
 "Respect"
 "Advance Directives and Substitute Decision-Making"
 "Decision-Making Capacity"

External links
 Bioethicsweb at Intute: Clinical ethics committees
Johns Hopkins ICTR Research Ethics Consulting Service

Medical ethics